Freedom and Justice Party may refer to:

Freedom and Justice Party (Bolivia)
Freedom and Justice Party (Egypt)
Freedom and Justice (Lithuania)
Russian Party of Freedom and Justice
Party of Freedom and Justice (Stranka slobode i pravde), a political party in Serbia

See also
Justice and Freedom Party (Fiji)
Freedom and Social Justice (Palestinian Authority)
Freedom Party (disambiguation)
Justice Party (disambiguation)